William Friedrich (born June 17, 1876, date of death unknown) was an American gymnast. He competed in four events at the 1904 Summer Olympics.

References

External links
 

1876 births
Year of death missing
American male artistic gymnasts
Olympic gymnasts of the United States
Athletes (track and field) at the 1904 Summer Olympics
Gymnasts at the 1904 Summer Olympics
Place of birth missing